Kya Rosa is a beautifully decorated late-Victorian house at the main entrance to the University of Pretoria in Pretoria, South Africa.

The original building was constructed in Skinner Street in 1895 and belonged to Leo Weinthal, owner of The Press. It was named after his wife, Rosa. The word ‘Kya’ is the Zulu word for ‘house’.

Kya Rosa later became the first home of the then Transvaal University College (TUC) – the predecessor of the University of Pretoria – but by 1915 it was no longer in use. In 1980, the university commissioned the construction of a replica of the house where it stands today – at the Roper Street entrance to the university. Work began in 1983, under the guidance of architect Albrecht Holm, an alumnus of the University of Pretoria.

Precise measurements were taken from the original building and old photographs were used as reference to ensure that the reconstructed building closely resembles the original house. Many of the original Victorian fittings were used in the reconstruction. Today, Kya Rosa houses the Office for Alumni Relations and incorporates a small conference and entertainment centre. The house was officially opened by Dr Anton Rupert on 25 October 1985.

External links
Kya Rosa on UPSpace
University of Pretoria
Kya Rosa - Home of Alumni

University of Pretoria buildings
University and college buildings completed in 1895
1895 establishments in the South African Republic
19th-century architecture in South Africa